The 1950 Boston Red Sox season was the 50th season in the franchise's Major League Baseball history. The Red Sox finished third in the American League (AL) with a record of 94 wins and 60 losses, four games behind the AL and World Series champion New York Yankees. This was the last time that the Red Sox won at least 90 games until their return to the World Series in 1967.

The team scored 1,027 runs, one of only six teams to score more than 1,000 runs in a season in the modern era (post-1900), and, along with the 1999 Cleveland Indians, are one of two teams to do so post-World War II. The 1950 Red Sox compiled a .302 batting average, and remain the most recent major league team to record a .300 or higher team batting average for a season.

In a game on June 8, the Red Sox set a major league record for total bases by a team in one game, which still stands. During their 29–4 win over the St. Louis Browns, the Red Sox collected 28 hits: 7 home runs, 1 triple, 9 doubles, and 11 singles for 60 total bases. The Red Sox, who had already beaten the Browns 20–4 the day before, became only the second team since 1901 (after the 1925 Pittsburgh Pirates) to score 20 or more runs in consecutive games.

Regular season

Season standings

Record vs. opponents

Opening Day lineup

Roster

Player stats

Batting

Starters by position 
Note: Pos = Position; G = Games played; AB = At bats; H = Hits; Avg. = Batting average; HR = Home runs; RBI = Runs batted in

Other batters 
Note: G = Games played; AB = At bats; H = Hits; Avg. = Batting average; HR = Home runs; RBI = Runs batted in

Pitching

Starting pitchers 
Note: G = Games pitched; IP = Innings pitched; W = Wins; L = Losses; ERA = Earned run average; SO = Strikeouts

Other pitchers 
Note: G = Games pitched; IP = Innings pitched; W = Wins; L = Losses; ERA = Earned run average; SO = Strikeouts

Relief pitchers 
Note: G = Games pitched; W = Wins; L = Losses; SV = Saves; ERA = Earned run average; SO = Strikeouts

Farm system 

LEAGUE CHAMPIONS: Roanoke, Marion

References

External links
1950 Boston Red Sox team page at Baseball Reference
1950 Boston Red Sox season at baseball-almanac.com

Boston Red Sox seasons
Boston Red Sox
Boston Red Sox
1950s in Boston